Apartment 143 (original title: Emergo) is a 2012 Spanish horror film written by Rodrigo Cortes and directed by Carles Torrens. It was released on 4 May 2012.

Premise
A parapsychology team is asked to investigate the White family in Apartment 143. Alan White (Kai Lennox) has lost his wife initially explained as being to an unspecified illness, but later clarified as an automobile accident during a psychotic episode. The family started to experience strange events shortly after the death, and relocated from their prior home to the apartment to escape them. The move was initially successful, but after about a week strange incidents resumed in the new location.

The team consists of Dr. Helzer (Michael O'Keefe), Paul Ortega (Rick Gonzalez), and the technician, Ellen Keegan (Fiona Glascott). After they set up their equipment, they get some compelling evidence on camera.

Cast
Kai Lennox  ...  Alan White 
Gia Mantegna  ...  Caitlin White  
Fiona Glascott  ...  Ellen Keegan  
Francesc Garrido  ...  Heseltine  
Rick Gonzalez  ...  Paul Ortega 
Michael O'Keefe  ...  Dr. Helzer
Damian Roman ... Benny White
Laura Martuscelli ... Cynthia
Fermi Reixach ... Lamson

Reception
Apartment 143 currently has a 17% on Rotten Tomatoes based on 6 reviews, with an average rating of 2.9/10.

References

External links
 
 
 
 Apartment 143 on AllMovie
 Official Website

2012 films
Spanish horror films
2012 horror films
Found footage films
Films set in apartment buildings
2010s English-language films
2010s Spanish films
Spanish supernatural horror films
Spanish ghost films